Stephen Volk (born 3 July 1954) is a Welsh screenwriter and novelist who specializes in the horror genre. He wrote the screenplays for numerous horror films, including Ken Russell's Gothic (1986), The Kiss (1988), and William Friedkin's The Guardian (1990). In 1992, Volk wrote the teleplay for the BBC mockumentary Ghostwatch. Other screenwriting credits include Octane (2003) and  The Awakening (2011).

Early life and work
Stephen Volk was born in Pontypridd, Wales on 3 July 1954. Volk has stated his interest in horror was triggered by watching the TV drama The Stone Tape by Nigel Kneale, and the film Don't Look Now by Nicolas Roeg. He studied at Lanchester Polytechnic in Coventry, and the University of Bristol. Volk then worked as an advertising copywriter before becoming a full-time writer. Volk's first produced work was Ken Russell's film Gothic in 1986. Volk also wrote a script, Horror Movie, for Goldcrest Films that was never made due to Goldcrest's collapse.

Ghostwatch
His most famous work is Ghostwatch, a controversial drama shown on BBC1 on Halloween 1992. It is commonly misrepresented as a hoax documentary, but this was never the intention. It was originally planned as a six-part series for the BBC. However, the producer of the series, Ruth Baumgarten, didn't believe it had commercial viability. Stephen reworked the script so that everything would be set "Like episode six" and repitched it as a 90-minute live broadcast drama on behalf of BBC's Screen One drama segment. Ruth accepted the new format.

Other work
Volk's TV work often involves the supernatural and the paranormal, such as with the ITV1 thriller series Afterlife (2005–06). Volk has written fiction in the horror and ghost story genres; some of these stories were collected in the book Dark Corners (2006). In 1995, Volk wrote two serials of the series Ghosts. Volk's fiction often features real people as characters: the novella Whitstable (2013) features the actor Peter Cushing, while Leytonstone (2015) deals with a young Alfred Hitchcock. In 2018, Volk published The Dark Masters Trilogy, an omnibus featuring Whitstable and Leytonstone, as well as a new novella, Netherwood. Netherwood features fictionalised versions of the writer Dennis Wheatley and the occultist Aleister Crowley. Volk also wrote a monthly column about horror for Black Static magazine until the end of 2016.

Volk's story "The Chapel of Unrest" was read on stage by actor Jim Broadbent at London's Bush Theatre in 2013.

Bibliography

Novels and novellas
 Gothic (1987, novelisation of the 1986 film)
 Vardøger (2009)
 Whitstable (2013)
 Leytonstone (2015)

Short story collections
 Dark Corners (2006)
 Monsters in the Heart (2013)
 The Parts We Play (2016)

Filmography

Personal life

He and his wife Patricia, who is a sculptor, live in Bradford-on-Avon, Wiltshire.

References and notes

Sources

External links

 Filmography
 BBC interview
 Stephen Volk's Website
 Story behind "Monsters in the Heart" - Online Essay by Stephen Volk

1954 births
Living people
Ghost story writers
People from Bradford-on-Avon
People from Pontypridd
People from Wiltshire
Alumni of the University of Bristol
Welsh male novelists
Welsh screenwriters
Welsh horror writers
Welsh television writers